Richard Dupont (born 1968) is a Postdigital American artist whose installations, sculptures, paintings and prints examine the social implications of 21st Century digital technology.

Early life and education 
Dupont was born in New York City in 1968. He received an AB degree from the Departments of Visual Art and Art and Archeology at Princeton University in 1991. He has lived in New York City since 1991.

Artistic practice 
A pioneer in the field of Digital Art, Dupont began using scanners and 3D printing in 2002 to capture and replicate distorted images of his body. Dupont had his whole body scanned at a General Dynamics facility on The Wright-Patterson Air Force Base in 2004. Dupont's work examines the degree to which the primacy of the human gesture has been radically altered by the onset of digital technology. He also uses his art to interrogate expressions of power and control, and to examine how anthropometry, the Victorian science of mapping the body, has morphed over the past century into biometrics.

Exhibitions and awards 
In 2005, Dupont was invited to present a solo project at Art Basel Miami in the Art Positions sector. In 2008, Dupont was commissioned by The Lever House Art Collection to present a major installation at Lever House. The installation was widely acclaimed.  Between 2008 and 2015, Dupont's work was exhibited at The Middlebury College Museum of Art, The Flag Art Foundation, The Queens Museum, The Museum of Arts and Design, The Cleveland Museum of Art, The Museum of Contemporary Art San Diego, The Powerhouse Museum, and The Underground Museum, Los Angeles. In 2014, Dupont was awarded the Museum of Arts and Design Visionary Award.

Collections 

Dupont's works are included in the collections of The Museum of Modern Art, The Whitney Museum of American Art, Museum of Fine Arts, Boston, The Cleveland Museum of Art, The Brooklyn Museum, The Hammer Museum, The Museum of Contemporary Art San Diego, and the New York Public Library print collection among others.

References

External links 
 Richard Dupont at Queens Museum
 Richard Dupont at Tracy Williams
 Richard Dupont at Carolina Nitsch 
 The Lever House Art Collection | Richard Dupont
 MoMA Collection | Richard Dupont
 MoMA Inside Out
 Middlebury College Museum of Art | Four Works by New York Artist Richard Dupont
 Hudson Valley Center for Contemporary Art | Richard Dupont Between Stations
 The Lever House Art Collection Video
 The New York Times Art in Review

Artists from New York City
Living people
1968 births
Princeton University alumni
Post-conceptual artists